The following is a list of sports venues found in the Greater Manila Area in the Philippines which are in current use.

In July 2014, the Philippine Sports Stadium and the Philippine Arena opened in Santa Maria and Bocaue, Bulacan. They are the largest football stadium and indoor arena in the Philippines which served as the venue for some of the 2015 AFC Cup group stage matches and the first Philippine Basketball Association games for the 2014–15 season.

In 2012, the  Mall of Asia Arena opened  within the SM Mall of Asia complex in Pasay. This indoor arena hosted the 2013 FIBA Asia Championship. Other popular venues in the region include the Smart Araneta Coliseum in Quezon City which hosts several professional and collegiate basketball leagues, and the Rizal Memorial Stadium in Malate which is home to both the Philippine national football team and the Philippines national rugby union team.

Indoor arenas

Stadiums

Aquatics center

Pitches

Bowling alleys
 AMF-Puyat Bowling Center
Astrobowl, Starmall Alabang (Muntinlupa)
Commonwealth Lanes, Ever Gotesco (Quezon City)
Coronado Lanes, Starmall EDSA-Shaw (Mandaluyong)
Super Bowl, Makati Square "Formerly Makati Cinema Square" (Makati)
Bowling Alley San Antonio (Parañaque)
Paeng's Bowl & Billiard Room
Eastwood CityWalk II (Quezon City)
Robinsons Galleria (Quezon City)
Robinsons Place Manila (Ermita)
 SM Bowling Center
SM Center Valenzuela (Valenzuela)
SM City Fairview (Quezon City)
SM City North Edsa, (Quezon City)
SM Mall of Asia (Pasay)
SM Southmall (Las Piñas)
SM City Sucat (Parañaque)

Golf
 Alabang Golf Country Club (Muntinlupa)
 Army Golf Club (Fort Bonifacio)
 Camp Aguinaldo Golf Club (Quezon City)
 Capitol Hills Golf and Country Club (Quezon City)
 Club Intramuros Golf Course (Intramuros)
 Manila Golf and Country Club (Makati)
 Philippine Navy Golf Club (Fort Bonifacio)
 Veterans Golf Course (Quezon City)
 Villamor Golf Course (Pasay)
 Wack Wack Golf and Country Club (Mandaluyong)

Ice rinks
 SM Mall of Asia (Pasay)
 SM Megamall (Mandaluyong)
 SM Southmall (Las Piñas)

Jai alai
 Casino Español de Manila (Ermita)

Marina
 Manila Yacht Club (Malate)

Polo and equestrian
 Manila Polo Club (Makati)

Racing venues

Motor racing tracks
Carmona Racing Circuit (Carmona, Cavite)
 Citykart Racing, Circuit Makati (Makati)

Horse-racing tracks

 The Horsemen's Track, Hapi Jockey Club (Padre Garcia, Batangas; underconstruction)
 Metro Manila Turf Club (Malvar, Batangas)
 San Lazaro Race Track, San Lazaro Leisure Park (Carmona, Cavite)
 Santa Ana Race Track, Saddle and Clubs Leisure Park (Naic, Cavite)

Tennis
 Brittany Tennis Club (Quezon City)
 Club Filipino (San Juan)
 Makati Sports Club (Makati)
 Philippine Columbian Sports Club (Paco)
 Quezon City Sports Club (Quezon City)
 Rizal Memorial Sports Complex (Malate)
 The Metropolitan Club (Makati)
 The Village Sports Club (Parañaque)
 Valle Verde Country Club (Pasig)

Gallery

See also
 List of sporting events in the Greater Manila Area

References

External links
 GolfPH - Metro Manila Golf Courses
 Philippine Racing Commission
 Metro Manila Tennis Courts
 Manila Polo Club
 Venues.ph

 
Manila
sports venues